Attila Rajnay (born 3 June 1979 in Budapest) is a retired Hungarian football player.

External links 

1979 births
Living people
Footballers from Budapest
Hungarian footballers
Association football defenders
Ferencvárosi TC footballers
III. Kerületi TUE footballers
FC Fót footballers
Százhalombattai LK footballers
FC Tatabánya players
Lombard-Pápa TFC footballers
Budaörsi SC footballers